Albert Brough MM (20 July 1895 – 28 May 1980) was an English professional rugby league and association football (soccer) footballer who played in the 1920s.

Background
Albert Brough was born in Barrow-in-Furness, Lancashire, England, he was awarded the Military Medal during World War I for bravery in the field, he died aged 84 in Chichester, West Sussex, England.

Rugby league playing career

International honours
Albert Brough won caps for Great Britain (RL) while at Oldham in 1924 against Australia, and New Zealand.

Challenge Cup Final appearances
Albert Brough played right-, i.e. number 12, and scored a penalty goal in Oldham's 4–21 defeat by Wigan in the 1923–24 Challenge Cup Final during the 1923–24 season at Athletic Grounds, Rochdale on Saturday 12 April 1924, in front of a crowd of 41,831, he played right-, and scored a try in the 16–3 victory over Hull Kingston Rovers in the 1924–25 Challenge Cup Final during the 1924–25 season at Headingley Rugby Stadium, Leeds on Saturday 25 April 1925, in front of a crowd of 28,335, he played left-, i.e. number 5, in the 3–9 defeat by Swinton in the 1925–26 Challenge Cup Final during the 1925–26 season at Athletic Grounds, Rochdale on Saturday 1 May 1926, in front of a crowd of 27,000, and he played  in the 26–7 victory over Swinton in the 1926–27 Challenge Cup Final during the 1926–27 season at Central Park, Wigan on Saturday 7 May 1927, in front of a crowd of 33,448.

County Cup Final appearances
Albert Brough played right-, i.e. number 12, in Oldham's 10–0 victory over St Helens Recs in the 1924 Lancashire County Cup Final during the 1924–25 season at The Willows, Salford on Saturday 22 November 1924.

Association football (soccer) playing career
Albert Brough normally played as a fullback, however he played goalkeeper in Barrow A.F.C.'s 1–4 defeat by Durham City A.F.C. in the last game of the 1922–23 Football League season of the Football League Third Division North at Kepier Haughs, Durham. He also played for Mossley in the 1929–30 season of the Cheshire County League, making seven appearances and scoring one goal.

References

External links
Great Britain Statistics at englandrl.co.uk (statistics currently missing due to not having appeared for both Great Britain, and England)
Statistics  at orl-heritagetrust.org.uk
Image of Albert Brough at mossleyweb.com
Search for "Albert Brough" at britishnewspaperarchive.co.uk

1895 births
1980 deaths
Association football fullbacks
Association football goalkeepers
Barrow A.F.C. players
Barrow Raiders players
British Army personnel of World War I
English Football League players
English footballers
English rugby league players
Great Britain national rugby league team players
Lancashire rugby league team players
Mossley A.F.C. players
Oldham R.L.F.C. players
Outfield association footballers who played in goal
Recipients of the Military Medal
Rugby league locks
Rugby league players from Barrow-in-Furness
Rugby league second-rows
Footballers from Barrow-in-Furness
Footballers from Cumbria